Gerhard Sommer (14 September 1919 – 12 May 1944) was a Luftwaffe ace and recipient of the Knight's Cross of the Iron Cross during World War II.  The Knight's Cross of the Iron Cross was awarded to recognise extreme battlefield bravery or successful military leadership - for the fighter pilots, it was a quantifiable measure of skill and combat success.  Gerhard Sommer was killed on 12 May 1944 after aerial combat with P-47 fighters.  He was posthumously awarded the Knight's Cross of the Iron Cross on 27 July 1944. During his career he was credited with 20 aerial victories, all on the  Western Front.

Career
Born 14 September 1919 at Steinpleis near Zwickau in Saxony. After completing his pilot training, about December 1941, Leutnant Sommer was posted to the 3rd Staffel of Jagdgeschwader 1 (3./JG 1). At the time the unit was on Reich Defence duties, and relatively quiet covering the north-western approaches across the North Sea. It was not until 11 August 1942 that he scored his first victory - an RAF Wellington bomber southwest of Helgoland island. In autumn 1942 he was transferred and promoted to Staffelkapitän (Squadron Leader) of 1./ JG 1.

It was 26 February 1943 before he scored his second victory - a B-17 of the 8th US Bomber Command, the first of his 15 Viermot (4-engined bomber) victories. Having started in late January, the daylight incursions from the American bombers would become constant and steadily increase in size. However, with the Allied escort fighters forced to turn back as they neared the German frontier for lack of fuel, the German commanders had the time to carefully improve and hone their combat tactics against these mighty opponents. The threat was quickly appreciated and a new air unit, JG 11, was authorised to be set up for Reich defence, by drawing on the experienced cadre of pilots in JG 1. Thus, on 1 April 1943, Sommer's squadron 1./JG 1 was redesignated 4./JG 11.

So by 17 April, when the Americans made their first and only raid in April, (on the Focke Wulf factory in Bremen) the Luftwaffe could now field over 20 squadrons of Bf109 and Fw190 fighters and it proved to be the costliest raid (Mission #50) to date: 16 of the 115 bombers were shot down. Although Sommer himself didn't add to his tally that day, Heinz Knoke and his pilots of sister-squadron 5./JG 11 had a degree of success by air-to-air bombing - dropping bombs into the middle of the bomber formations, primed on a short time-delay fuse, to break up and scatter the formation to make individual aircraft more vulnerable.

Sommer did score a B-24 victory (his 4th overall) on the 14 May raid (Mission #56 on the submarine pens at Kiel), and his 5th a week later (a B-17 over Wilhelmshaven). About this time, II./JG 11 was re-equipping with Bf109G-6 'gunboats', carrying a pair of underwing 30mm cannons for a far-heavier punch. Now an experienced pilot against the Viermots Sommer's tally steadily rose and he scored a victory on most of the American raids in 1943. The odds were now stacking up against the American bombers, still without fighter cover over a good third of their mission, and with increasing numbers of Luftwaffe fighters drawn into Reich Defence. For example, on 13 June, where Sommer scored his 7th victory, the Mission #62 on Kiel lost a catastrophic 22 bombers out of 60 sent. Desperate to provide any sort of fighter cover, the Allies were trying to develop jettisonable fuel-tanks on their P-47D Thunderbolts to give them extra range.

The last week of July was designated by the Allies for Operation Gomorrah - a 6-day round-the-clock pounding of the Reich by the Americans by day and the British by night (including the devastating Hamburg fire-raid of 27 July). Sommer shot down 3 bombers that week, taking his tally now to 11 victories. Missing the carnage of the combined Schweinfurt/Regensburg raids (#84) in August, Sommer's next victory was a B-17 on 27 September. This raid marked the operational debut of the long-range P-47s, now finally able to escort the bombers well into the Reich, and despite Sommer's success, II./JG 11 took its heaviest losses to date.

Reflecting the change in the airwar over the Reich, Sommer's three victories (15-17v.) in December 1943 were all P-47 escort fighters. Another aspect was the vast increase in numbers - his 18th victory, a B-17, was one of 650 bombers sent on Mission #182 to bomb the aircraft factories in the Brunswick area. The bad weather of January 1944 limited operations but February saw the advent of the P-51 Mustang - a fighter capable of escorting the bombers for the full 100% mission distance, forever tipping the scales in the Allies favour in the Reich bombing campaign. February 20 was the start of Operation Avalanche, better known as 'Big Week', a coordinated assault on the Luftwaffe, its airfields and its factories, then in March attention turned to Berlin.

Gerhard Sommer would not survive the war though - he scored a final Viermot on the Berlin raid of 29 April (Mission #327), in what would be the last time in the war that the 8th USAAF lost over 60 bombers on a mission. Promoted to Hauptmann on 1 May, his last victory was a P-47 fighter on yet another Berlin raid, on 8 May. Four days later, on 12 May, still as the StaKa (Staffelkapitän) of 4./JG 11, he was shot down and killed in his Bf109 G-6 'White 14' (W.Nr 140028) by P-47 fighters south of Bielefeld.

At the time of his death, Hauptmann Sommer was 24 years old and one of the Luftwaffe's highest scoring Viermot-Töters (Bomber-killers) with 14 (or 15) of his confirmed 20 victories being Viermots. In recognition of this he was awarded a posthumous Knight's Cross on 27 July 1944.

Victories

Awards
 Flugzeugführerabzeichen
 Front Flying Clasp of the Luftwaffe
 Iron Cross (1939)
 2nd Class
 1st Class
 Ehrenpokal der Luftwaffe (26 November 1943)
 German Cross in Gold on 20 March 1944 as Oberleutnant in the 4./Jagdgeschwader 11
 Knight's Cross of the Iron Cross on 27 July 1944 as Hauptmann and Staffelkapitän of the 4./Jagdgeschwader 11

References

Citations

Bibliography

 
 
 
 Spick, Mike (2006). Aces of the Reich. 	Greenhill Books. 
 Weal, John (1999). Bf109F/G/K Aces of the Western Front. 	Oxford: Osprey Publishing Ltd.	.
 Weal, John (2006). Bf109 Defence of the Reich Aces. 	Oxford: Osprey Publishing Ltd.	.

1919 births
1944 deaths
People from Werdau
German World War II flying aces
Recipients of the Gold German Cross
Recipients of the Knight's Cross of the Iron Cross
Luftwaffe personnel killed in World War II
Military personnel from Saxony
Aviators killed by being shot down